The Canadian Police Information Centre (CPIC; , CIPC) is the central police database where Canada's law enforcement agencies can access information on a number of matters. It is Canada's only national law enforcement networking computer system ensuring officers all across the country can access the same information. There are approximately 3 million files generated each year and is the responsibility of the originating agency to ensure the data integrity of each file.

CPIC was approved for use by the Treasury Board of Canada and became operational in 1972. It is maintained by the Royal Canadian Mounted Police (RCMP) with the central registry located at the RCMP Headquarters in Ottawa, Ontario, Canada. CPIC is interfaced with the United States National Crime Information Center and National Law Enforcement Telecommunications System but not all information are shared. For example, Wandering Persons Registry information is not shared across the border.

In order for a government agency to access CPIC, they must agree to abide by the rules set out in the CPIC Reference Manual and be approved by the CPIC Advisory Committee, composed of 26 senior police officers from municipal and provincial police forces, the Ontario Police Commission and the RCMP. Non-policing agencies must also enter a memorandum of understanding with the RCMP and may be audited from time to time for compliance.

CPIC is broken down into four data banks: Investigative, Identification, Intelligence and Ancillary which contain information on:

 Vehicles/marine
 Stolen or abandoned vehicles/boats
 Persons
 Wanted persons
 People who are accused of crime(s)
 People on probation or parolees
 Special Interest Police (SIP)
 Judicial orders
 Access to the Offender Management System of Correctional Service of Canada
 Missing persons
 Stolen property
 Dental characteristics
 Canadian Firearms Registry of the Canadian Firearms Program
 Wandering Persons Registry
 Alzheimer's disease patients who register with the Alzheimer Society of Canada in case they go missing
 CPIC criminal surveillance
 Criminal intelligence gathered across the country
 Criminal Record Synopsis
 Condensed information about a person's criminal record

Local, municipal and provincial police services in Canada, as well as federal law enforcement agencies such as the Canada Border Services Agency and Military Police maintain their own local records in addition to CPIC records.  Local records are maintained of all contact with police for a variety of reasons, and may or may not contain information that would be entered into the CPIC system.  All CPIC agencies are subject to audit on a 4-year cycle.  All records added to the CPIC system must satisfy stringent entry criteria in that every record must be, valid, accurate, complete in nature and compliant with input rules.  The province of British Columbia has mandated by law that all police forces share a platform, known as PRIME-BC. In Ontario local records are now kept in systems known either as NICHE or Versadex, depending on the Municipalities choice of implementation.  In Quebec the system used is called CRPQ (Centre de Reseignement des Policiers du Québec). The RCMP runs a similar system called PROS (Police Reporting Occurrence System) in provinces where they are providing contract policing as well for federal policing.

WikiLeaks controversy
In 2011, the Toronto-based Psychiatric Patient Advocate Office announced it had received numerous complaints from people who were denied entry into the United States, because their names were on the American Department of Homeland Security watchlist and the names were provided by the Canadian Police Information Centre, which is available to American law enforcement authorities, according to WikiLeaks.

See also
 Automatic Finger Identification System or AFIS
 Police National Computer, an equivalent system used by British law enforcement agencies

References

External links

Federal departments and agencies of Canada
1972 establishments in Canada
CPIC
Criminal records
Law enforcement databases
Databases in Canada